Sgambati is a surname. Notable people with the surname include:

Giovanni Sgambati (1841–1914), Italian pianist and composer
Kathleen Sgambati, American politician